Old Mother Riley in Business is a 1941 British comedy film directed by John Baxter and starring Arthur Lucan, Kitty McShane and Cyril Chamberlain. It was the sixth in the long-running Old Mother Riley series of films. Old Mother Riley's pub faces competition from a large chain store nearby, causing her to declare war on it.

Plot summary
Old Mother Riley comes to the rescue of local shopkeepers after a ruthless chain, "Golden Stores" makes its aggressive presence felt. The boisterous Irish washerwoman gives the chain stores boss a push into the river and soon finds herself a wanted woman, donning a nurse's outfit to escape from the hospital in which she is hiding.

Cast
 Arthur Lucan as Mrs. Riley
 Kitty McShane as  Kitty Riley
 Cyril Chamberlain as  John Halliwell
 Ernest Butcher
 O. B. Clarence
 Edgar Driver
 Morris Harvey
 Roddy Hughes
 Ruth Maitland
 Edie Martin
 Wally Patch
 Ernest Sefton
 Charles Victor

References

External links

1941 films
1941 comedy films
1940s English-language films
Films directed by John Baxter
British comedy films
British black-and-white films
1940s business films
Films shot at British National Studios
1940s British films